Dingwall in Ross-shire was a burgh constituency that elected one commissioner to the Parliament of Scotland and to the Convention of Estates.

After the Acts of Union 1707, Dingwall, Dornoch, Kirkwall, Tain and Wick formed the Tain district of burghs, returning one member between them to the House of Commons of Great Britain.

List of burgh commissioners

 1661–63, 1669–70: Alexander Bayne, provost  
 1672–74: Rodrick McKenzie, advocate at Edinburgh   
1665 convention, 1667 convention: not represented
 1678 convention: Hugh Mackenzie, merchant-burgess 
 1681–82: Sir Donald Bayne of Tulloch 
 1685–86: Donald Dingwall, dean of guild 
 1689 convention, 1689–1693: Kenneth Mackenzie, merchant burgess, bailie (disqualified 1698) 
 1698–1702: Robert Stewart of Tillicoultry, commissar of Edinburgh
 1702–07: John Bayne the younger of Tulloch

References

See also
 List of constituencies in the Parliament of Scotland at the time of the Union

Politics of the county of Ross
History of the Scottish Highlands
Constituencies of the Parliament of Scotland (to 1707)
Constituencies disestablished in 1707
1707 disestablishments in Scotland
Dingwall